Mercer House, Mercer Hall, and variations, may refer to:

United States
(by state)
 Mercer House (Savannah, Georgia)
 Buck-Mercer House, Somerset, Kentucky
 Mercer Union Meetinghouse, Mercer, Maine
 Mercer House (Natchez, Mississippi)
 Dr. Samuel D. Mercer House, Omaha, Nebraska
 Mercer Log House, Fairborn, Ohio
 Marquart-Mercer Farm, Springfield, Ohio
 Fonthill, Mercer Museum and Moravian Pottery and Tile Works, Doylestown, Pennsylvania
 Mercer Hall, Columbia, Tennessee

Australia
Mercer House, a now defunct teachers' college in Victoria, Australia

See also
 Greek Revival Houses of Mercer County: Lynnwood, Walnut Hall, Glenworth, Harrodsburg, Kentucky, listed on the NRHP in Mercer County, Kentucky